"Human Racing" is a song by the English singer-songwriter Nik Kershaw. It was the title track for his hit debut album of the same name, released in September 1984. It was the fourth hit single from the album, reaching No. 19 in the UK Singles Chart. It entered the chart in the week ending 15 September 1984, and remained within for seven weeks. An earlier version of the song, titled "Look Behind You", appeared on the 1980 album Till I Hear From You by Fusion, a band with Kershaw on vocals and guitar.

Track listing
7" Single (WEA NIK 5)
A "Human Racing" – 4:28
B "Faces" (Remix) – 4:40

7" Double Single (WEA NIKD 5)
Gatefold with the "Human Racing board game" printed on the fold out
A "Human Racing" – 4:28
B "Faces" (Remix) – 4:40
C "Cloak And Dagger" (Live) – 5:10
D "Drum Talk" (Live) – 4:05

12" Single (WEA NIKT 5)
A "Human Racing" (Remix) – 5:30
B "Faces" (Remix) – 4:40

12" Single (WEA NIKX 5)
A "Human Racing" (Remix) – 5:30	
B "Wouldn't It Be Good" (Remix) – 7:50

Credits
"Human Racing" 
Produced by Peter Collins

"Faces" (Remix)
Produced by Peter Collins
Special Remix by Simon Boswell

"Cloak And Dagger" (Live)
Recorded live at the Hammersmith Odeon
Mixed and Engineered by Simon Boswell

"Drum Talk" (Live)
Recorded live at the Hammersmith Odeon
Mixed and Engineered by Simon Boswell

"Human Racing" (Remix) 
Produced by Peter Collins
Special Extended Mix by Simon Boswell

"Wouldn't It Be Good" (Remix)
Produced by Peter Collins
Remix by Simon Boswell

Chart performance

References

External links
 
 
 
 
 

1984 singles
Nik Kershaw songs
1984 songs
Songs written by Nik Kershaw
Song recordings produced by Peter Collins (record producer)